Botkin or Botkina (feminine; Боткина) is a common Russian or Scottish surname which may refer to:
Benjamin A. Botkin (1901–1975), American folklorist and scholar
Cordelia Botkin (1854–1910), American murderer
Eugene Botkin (1865–1918), Russian court physician, father of Gleb and Tatiana
Gleb Botkin (1900–1969), novelist and founder of the Church of Aphrodite, son of Eugene Botkin
Jeremiah D. Botkin (1849–1921), U.S. Representative from Kansas
Kirk Botkin (born 1971), American football player who performed in the National Football League; college football coach
Max Botkin, American screenwriter and producer
Mikhail Botkin (1839-1914), Russian artist
Sean Botkin, American pianist
Sergey Botkin (1832–1889), Russian clinician and therapist
Vasily Botkin (1812-1869), critic and essayist, brother of Sergey Botkin
Tatiana Botkina (1898–1986), daughter of Russian court physician Eugene Botkin